Christophe Robert (born 30 March 1964) is a French former professional footballer who played as a striker.

He is famous for having been involved in the bribery scandal involving Olympique de Marseille and his team US Valenciennes. He and teammates Jorge Burruchaga and Jacques Glassmann were contacted by OM player Jean-Jacques Eydelie, in order to let l'OM win and, more importantly, not to injure any OM player ahead of the UEFA Champions League final. He was then suspended for two seasons by the French Football Federation.

References

External links
 Profile
 Profile

Living people
1964 births
Association football forwards
French footballers
FC Nantes players
AS Monaco FC players
Valenciennes FC players
Ferro Carril Oeste footballers
Louhans-Cuiseaux FC players
AS Nancy Lorraine players
AS Saint-Étienne players
Ligue 1 players
Ligue 2 players
Association football controversies
Sportspeople from Dordogne
Footballers from Nouvelle-Aquitaine